The King's College London Act 1997 (c iii) is an Act of Parliament of the United Kingdom on the governance structure of King's College, London.

Contents
The Act makes various amendments to the structure of the College, and its governance.

List of sections
1.Short title
2.Interpretation
3.Appointed day
4.Dissolution of Schools
5.Transfer of property, etc
6.Constitution of Continuing Trustees of Schools
7.Restriction on use of certain property
8.Transfer of liabilities, etc
9.Savings for agreements, deeds, actions, etc
10.Construction of bequests, etc
11.Transfer of powers to appoint or nominate
12.Name of College school of medicine and dentistry
13.Dissolution of Delegacy
14.Repeals and amendments
15.Amendments to College Statutes
16.Transitional amendments to College Statutes

See also
UK enterprise law
UK constitutional law
UK labour law

Notes

References
King's College London Act 1997 text on legislation.gov.uk

History of King's College London
Universities in the United Kingdom
University governance
Educational administration
University-related legislation